Meenakshi World School (also known as MWS) was a primary and secondary International School situated in Sector 10 Gurgaon. l

History 
This school was founded in the year 2008 in Gurgaon. It was affiliated to Cambridge International School and follows IGCSE (International General Certificate of Secondary Education) curriculum, and officially dissolved in early 2021, with the premises being taken over by the G D Goenka group.

See also
Education in India
Literacy in India  
List of institutions of higher education in Haryana

References

External links 
  (dysfunctional)
 Cambridge International School Website

International schools in India
Primary schools in India
High schools and secondary schools in Haryana
Private schools in Haryana
Schools in Gurgaon
2008 establishments in Haryana
Educational institutions established in 2008